David Cruickshank is an Australian former rugby league footballer who played in the 1980s. He played for South Sydney and Eastern Suburbs in the New South Wales Rugby League (NSWRL) competition, plus for Fulham RLFC (Heritage № 185) and Salford in England in 1990-91

Playing career
Cruickshank made his first grade debut for Eastern Suburbs in round 18 1985 against Manly-Warringah at Brookvale Oval which ended in a 22–0 loss.

In 1986, Cruickshank signed for arch rivals South Sydney and made his debut against his former club in round 6 1986.  South Sydney would end up finishing the season in second place just one point behind minor premiers Parramatta.  Cruickshank played in the club's qualifying final loss against Canterbury-Bankstown.  Souths were eliminated the following week after losing to rivals Balmain.  

In 1987, Souths finished in 5th position on the table and qualified for the finals.  Cruickshank played in the club's minor preliminary finals victory over Balmain.  The following week, Cruickshank played in the club's humiliating 46–12 loss against the Canberra Raiders.  The match was best remembered for Souths player Steve Mavin and his numerous errors which lead to him being substituted at half time.

In 1989, Cruickshank made 10 appearances for Souths as the club won the minor premiership.  He did not play in the finals series and departed the club at the end of the year.  Cruickshank made a total of 88 appearances for Souths across all grades.

References

1965 births
Living people
Australian rugby league players
London Broncos players
Place of birth missing (living people)
Rugby league fullbacks
Salford Red Devils players
South Sydney Rabbitohs players